Albert John Weatherhead Jr. (March 26, 1892 – December 14, 1966) was an American college football player and coach. He served as the head football coach at Bowdoin College from 1916 to 1917.

References

1892 births
1966 deaths
American football ends
Bowdoin Polar Bears football coaches
Harvard Crimson football players
Sportspeople from Cleveland
Players of American football from Cleveland